Gordon Murray Automotive is a British automobile manufacturer of sports cars based in Shalford, Surrey, England, which was founded in 2017 by former Formula 1 designer Gordon Murray. The company's initial focus is on limited-run supercars.  Its T.50 car entered production in 2023. 

The design consultancy firm Gordon Murray Design is a sister company to Gordon Murray Automotive.

GMA car models
Gordon Murray Automotive T.50
Gordon Murray Automotive T.33

References

External links
Official website
Gordon Murray Design

Vehicle manufacturing companies established in 2017
British brands
Car manufacturers of the United Kingdom
Sports car manufacturers
Car brands
Luxury motor vehicle manufacturers
2017 establishments in the United Kingdom